Exponential constant may refer to:
 e (mathematical constant)
 The growth or decay constant in exponential growth or exponential decay, respectively.